Maris A. Vinovskis is an American academic and historian at the University of Michigan and a leading authority on U.S. social and family history.  He is the A. M. and H. P. Bentley Professor of History and a Professor of Public Policy, Gerald R. Ford School of Public Policy.  Vinovskis acts as a Senior Research Scientist in the Institute of Social Research. He is a former chairman of the Department of History.

Vinovskis holds a Ph.D. from Harvard University.  He has received a Guggenheim fellowship and was elected to the National Academy of Education, the International Academy of Education, and President of the History of Education Society.

In 1978, Vinovskis was the Deputy Staff Director to the U.S. House Select Committee on Population and served as a consultant on population and adolescent pregnancy issues in the U.S. Department of Health, Education, and Welfare in the early 1980s. During both the George H. W. Bush and Bill Clinton administrations, he worked as a Research Advisor to the Assistant Secretary of the Office of Educational Research and Improvement (OERI) on questions of educational research and policy. Vinovskis was a member of the congressionally mandated Independent Review Panels for Goals 2000 and No Child Left Behind.

Publications
 The Origins of Public High Schools (University of Wisconsin Press, 1985)
 An "Epidemic" of Adolescent Pregnancy? (Oxford University Press, 1988)
 Education, Society and Economic Opportunity" (New Haven: Yale University Press, 1995)
 History and Educational Policymaking (Yale University Press, 1999)
 Revitalizing Federal Education Research(University of Michigan Press, 2001)
 The Birth of Head Start (University of Chicago Press, 2005)
 From a Nation at Risk to No Child Left Behind (Teachers College Press, 2009).

External links
 Vinovskis/University of Michigan

21st-century American historians
21st-century American male writers
Harvard University alumni
Living people
University of Michigan faculty
Gerald R. Ford School of Public Policy faculty
Faculty
Year of birth missing (living people)
American male non-fiction writers
Educational researchers
American historians of education